André Bac (1905–1989) was a French cinematographer.

Selected filmography
 The House of Mystery (1933)
 Le Jour Se Lève (1939)
 Patrie (1946)
 Desert Wedding (1948)
 The Perfume of the Lady in Black (1949)
 Good Lord Without Confession (1953)
 A Double Life (1954)
 Stain in the Snow (1954)
 The Affair of the Poisons (1955)
 The Fenouillard Family (1960)
 Herr Puntila and His Servant Matti (1960)
 Carom Shots (1963)

References

Bibliography
 Phillips, Alastair. City of Darkness, City of Light: Émigré Filmmakers in Paris, 1929-1939. Amsterdam University Press, 2004.

External links

1905 births
1989 deaths
Cinematographers from Paris